The Church of St Job is a 15th-century Roman Catholic church located overlooking the campo of the same name, known as Sant'Agiopo in Venetian dialect, on the south bank of the Cannaregio canal near Ponte dei Tre Archi in the sestiere of Cannaregio of Venice, northern Italy,

History
The church is dedicated to Saint Job. It is one of the five votive churches built in Venice after an onset of plague.

In 1378 a hospice with a small oratory dedicated to San Giobbe or Saint Job attached was begun on this site by Giovanni Contarini, on land he owned near his house. It was completed by his daughter Lucia, with the help of the Minor Observant Friars. The oratory was replaced by the present church by Bernardino of Siena, with the financial backing of doge Cristoforo Moro in gratitude for Bernardino's prophecy that Moro would become doge - Cristoforo donated 10,000 ducats to the building works in 1471, three months before his death, and was buried in the church. Work began in 1450, paused until 1470, and was finally consecrated in 1493, as one of the first examples of Renaissance architecture in the city. It was begun by Antonio Gambello and (when work began again in 1470) completed by the sculptor and architect Pietro Lombardo, with the latter designing the present altar arch and main door as well as much of the interior decoration.

It contains the tomb of René de Voyer de Paulmy d'Argenson, French ambassador to the Republic of Venice, by the French sculptors Claude Perreau and Thomas Blanchet. Its altarpieces house works by Vivarini, Pietro Lombardo, Luca Della Robbia, Basaiti and Bordone, as well as Girolamo Savoldo's  Il Presepio (1540). The church also formerly held Giovanni Bellini's San Giobbe Altarpiece and Vittore Carpaccio's The Presentation of Jesus in the Temple: these works are now in the Gallerie dell'Accademia.

See also
 History of medieval Arabic and Western European domes
 History of Italian Renaissance domes
 History of early modern period domes

Notes

Bibliography
 Le chiese di Venezia, Marcello Brusegan; Ed. Newton Compton 2008

External links

 La chiesa di San Giobbe e l'ospizio Zuanne Contarini, in Italian.
 Chorus
 Churches of Venice

Religious buildings and structures completed in 1493
Roman Catholic churches completed in 1493
Giobbe
Giobbe
Renaissance architecture in Venice
1378 establishments in Europe
14th-century establishments in the Republic of Venice
Plague churches